The Men's Discus Throw F44 had its Final held on September 15 at 17:40.

Medalists

Results

References
Final

Athletics at the 2008 Summer Paralympics